Richard Gay may refer to:
Richard Gay (MP for Portsmouth), Member of Parliament (MP) for Portsmouth,1388
Richard Gay (MP for Bath) (died 1641), MP for Bath
Richard Gay (rugby league) (born 1969), English rugby league footballer 
Richard Gay (skier) (born 1971), French Olympic freestyle skier
Richard Gay (field hockey), Welsh field hockey player